Calgary Animated Objects Society (CAOS) is a non-profit charitable arts organization based in Calgary, Alberta, Canada. Founded in 2003, CAOS is dedicated to the arts of mask, puppetry and animated objects, and to building community through different art. CAOS's major projects include the biennial International Festival of Animated Objects, and "Spirit of White Buffalo": a large-scale animated puppet and arts residency.

Origins and Goals
CAOS provides artistic opportunities through its activities, and initiates youth and community activities such as Young Spirit Voices, an aboriginal youth drama project, the Ramsay "Halloween Scream" and "The Great Ramsay Kinetic Sculpture Race".

CAOS is led by founder Xstine Cook, a mask and puppet artist, who ran the Green Fools Theatre for 13 years prior to founding CAOS. Xstine trained at the Dell'Arte International School of Physical Theatre in Blue Lake, California.

CAOS and the festival propel a very active local mask and puppetry tradition into an international arena, all the while bringing international attention to the city of Calgary. Extensive coverage for the organization can be found in FFWD magazine-Calgary's weekly arts & culture publication: "Calgary is a hotbed of original, unorthodox puppet work" (quote from an article written to cover CAOS's festival).

Spirit Of White Buffalo
CAOS also produces original art works, such as Spirit of White Buffalo. Guided by Cook, this giant kinetic sculpture was built by incarcerated men in Drumheller Institution, in collaboration with local artists, Jeff De Boer, and youth. "Spirit of White Buffalo" appeared at the 2007 Calgary Stampede Parade, and was awarded first place in "Best Western Theme".

Media coverage and recognition

The organizations' activities can be read about in various media: CBC Radio, CKUA Radio, CTV, and Citytv, CJSW Radio, The Calgary Herald,  Legacy Magazine, This Magazine,  The Gauntlet,  Metro News,  BeatRoute Magazine and numerous community-level publications.

Calgary Animated Objects Society has received national coverage for its activities consistently since 2005. The Globe and Mail credited CAOS with "putting Calgary in the pop-culture vanguard" in recognition of the International Festival of Animated Objects' programming, and the same article also drew attention to how "Calgary...has become one of the most fertile spots in North America for ground-breaking puppetry".

CAOS was awarded the "Innovative Business Practices Award" from the Rozsa Foundation for Arts Management.

Notes

External links 
 CAOS website
 AMMSA
 Calgary Herald
 Canadian Theatre Review
 FFWD 2009 Festival Preview
 FFWD 2009 Crawdaddy Review
 Calgary Herald 2009 Les Voisins Review
 Calgary Herald 2009 Alice Nelson Review

Theatre companies in Alberta
Theatre in Calgary
Puppet festivals
Organizations based in Calgary
Organizations established in 2003
Art festivals in Canada
2003 establishments in Alberta
Puppetry in Canada